This is a list of politicians who are Green Party of Canada members and have elected to office in Canada. Or members of the various provincial and territorial green paries who hold office in Canada. With the exception of those who sit in the Parliament of Canada, British Columbia Legislature, New Brunswick Legislature, the Legislative Assembly of Ontario and the Prince Edward Island Legislature most of these politicians have held municipal office in cities where there are no political parties.  While these individuals are members of the Green Party in their personal life and may have been supported by Party members, they were not elected as Green party members.

A

B

C

D

F

G

H

J

K

L

M

N

O

R

S

T

V

W

Z

References

 
Green
Canada
Green